Pappy's is a British three-man comedy act, composed of comedians Ben Clark, Matthew Crosby and Tom Parry. The sketch troupe previously performed shows at the Edinburgh Festival Fringe, but now mostly talk on podcasts about balconies and spaghetti. They regularly produce podcasts under the Pappy's Flatshare heading, and created and starred in the BBC Three sitcom Badults.

History 

Pappy's started out as a four-man comedy collective called "Pappy's Fun Club", consisting of Ben Clark, Matthew Crosby, Brendan Dodds, and Tom Parry. The group met at the University of Kent and started out performing in Canterbury and Wolverhampton. They later moved to London and in 2004, began performing regular shows in The Old Coffee House, in Soho, London. Pappy's Fun Club made their self-titled debut appearance at the Edinburgh Festival Fringe in 2006, as part of the Free Fringe. In February 2007, the group was nominated for Best Newcomer at the Chortle Awards.

In August 2007, the team returned to the Edinburgh Festival Fringe with their second show, which received critical acclaim. It was performed at Just The Tonic, located in C Soco urban garden, Cowgate. Several top comedy critics praised it, with Dominic Maxwell describing the show as "extraordinarily fresh" and Bruce Dessau praising their "instinctive rapport" and "the general air of merriment". However, not all reviews were positive, with Brian Logan's review of a performance in Brighton stating that "little distinguishes these four youngsters from countless other all-male sketch troupes". The show was nominated for the 2007 if.comedy award (formerly the Perrier Comedy Award, now the Edinburgh Comedy Awards). They later won the 2008 Chortle Award for best sketch, variety or character act.

In March 2008, the team performed their 2007 show at the Melbourne Comedy Festival. Later that year, they returned to the Edinburgh Festival Fringe with a new show, Funergy, performed at the Pleasance Cabaret Bar.

In 2009, the group returned to the Edinburgh Festival Fringe for a fourth consecutive year with a show called Pappy’s Fun Club’s World Record Attempt: 200 Sketches in an Hour. This show was performed in Pleasance One.

In late 2009, Pappy's Fun Club announced that they were parting with one of their founding members, Brendan Dodds, and moving forward as a trio called Pappy's. The split was not entirely reciprocal, with Brendan writing on Twitter that he was asked to leave as "a business decision" and Matthew stating in an interview that "the relationship we had with Brendan ran its course".

In early 2010, Pappy's became the first British act to perform at the SF Sketchfest. In August, they returned to the Fringe with a new show, All Business. Like the previous year, this show was performed in Pleasance One. The following year, the troupe took a year off from the Fringe - however, Matthew returned with a solo show called AdventureParty.

In 2012, Pappy's returned to the Fringe with a new show, Last Show Ever. This show received critical acclaim, receiving five-star reviews from The Telegraph, The Guardian, The Scotsman, The List, Chortle, and many others. The show received a nomination for the 2012 Edinburgh Comedy Award. Pappy's toured Last Show Ever around the UK in October and November, and in April 2013 performed it in a three-week run at the  Soho Theatre.

Podcasts
Pappy's currently produce three podcasts under the Pappy's Flatshare label:

 Flatshare Slamdown is a live panel show set in their shared flat, with Matthew Crosby as the landlord and host. In 2012 Flatshare Slamdown won the Loaded LAFTA award for Funniest Podcast.
 Beef Brothers Cold Cuts is a longer form of the Beef Brothers round of Flatshare Slamdown, in which Pappy's and a guest comedian attempt to solve listeners' personal problems, or "beefs".
 House Meeting feature Pappy's having an unscripted chat; the format is a continuation of their former podcast Bangers and Mash, which was iTunes Top New Comedy Podcast in 2011.

Television and radio
On 15 November 2007, Pappy's Fun Club appeared on the BBC Three comedy programme, Comedy Shuffle.

Pappy's (and Pappy's Fun Club) have made several pilots including a self-titled radio pilot for BBC Radio 4, broadcast on 12 May 2008, a self-titled Comedy Lab for Channel 4 television, broadcast on 28 August 2008, and a second Comedy Lab called Mr and Mrs Hotty Hott Hot Show, broadcast on 30 October 2011. None of these pilots were commissioned for further development.

Pappy's most notable television showpiece is that of Badults which aired on BBC Three in 2013 and 2014, starring themselves along with Emer Kenny, Katherine Ryan, Jack Docherty and Cariad Lloyd.

References

External links 

Pappy's Twitter
Pappy's Tumblr

Edinburgh Festival performers
British comedy troupes
Comedy collectives